Slick Idiot is a German electronic and industrial band.

History 
Slick Idiot was formed by former KMFDM members Günter Schulz and En Esch, following the 1999 breakup of KMFDM. Before taking on the name Slick Idiot, Esch and Schulz contributed a cover of Nine Inch Nails' "Terrible Lie" to Cleopatra Records' Covered in Nails 2: A Tribute to Nine Inch Nails. After releasing DickNity for purchase online, Slick Idiot, with core live members Mel Fuher and drummer/programmer Michael J. Carrasquillo, embarked on the "High Life for Low Lives" US tour in 2002. Cleopatra Records then re-released DickNity with a bonus remix by Christoph Schneider of Rammstein. In late 2003, Esch and Schulz joined as members of Pigface for the "United II" tour. In October 2004, Screwtinized was released online via their website and garnered rave reviews. En Esch toured again with Pigface on the "Free for All" US tour in 2005, while Schulz devoted his time to forming the side project SCHULZ with vocalist Jeff Borden. The band co-headlined, along with Hanzel und Gretyl, the first Gothicfest at the Odeum Expo Center in Illinois. In 2006, Slick Idiot completed a full US tour called the "xSCREWciating Tour", with More Machine Than Man. The tour saw the addition of live members Gregg Ziemba on drums and Victoria Levy on vocals.

As a tribute to the 2008 UEFA European Football Championship, which took place in Austria and Switzerland, and to the Austrian capital Vienna, Slick Idiot recorded a version of a famous traditional Austrian song, "Wien, Du Stadt meiner Träume", written by Rudolf Sieczynski. The song was released on 12 May 2008 as a digital download only.

Slick Idiot toured the US in late 2009, performing almost 50 shows in two months. The band released the album S U C K S E S S on 4 September 2009.

On 29 May 2010, Slick Idiot began the "Sucksess 2010 USA Tour" in Phoenix, Arizona, and continued the tour around the US. Accompanying Esch and Schulz were drummer Ziemba and singer Erica Dilanjian. Singer Mona Mur appeared as a featured guest to perform songs from 120 Tage – The Fine Art of Beauty and Violence, a collaboration album between Mur and Esch. Mur accompanied the band in 2010 and 2011 on two full Canada tours, and again in 2012 on the "Slick Idiot vs Mona Mur & En Esch Classick Tour 2012" with Dan Simoes (of Alvalanker) on guitar and Ethan Moseley (of Promonium Jesters) on drums. Mur again performed the Slick Idiot female vocal parts along with songs from the Mur and Esch collaboration.

Members

Current line-up 
En Esch – vocals, percussion, guitars, programming (1999–present)
Günter Schulz – guitars, programming (1999–present)
Erica Dilanjian – vocals (2009–present)

Guest members 
Michelle Boback – vocals (1999–2004)
Trixie Reiss – vocals (2000–2009, 2015–2016)
Abby Travis – vocals (2004)
Kasey James – vocals (2004)
Krisa Duiton – vocals (2004)
Charlie Zahn – saxophone (2004)
Victor Con Fuse – trombone (2004)
Rick Van Stonah – trumpet (2004)
Chuck "Chains" Lenihan – guitars (2009)
Hope Nicholls – vocals (2009)

Former members 
Michael J. Carrasquillo – live drums and keyboards (2002)
Melanie Fuher – live vocals (2002)
Gregg Ziemba – drums (2006–2010)
Victoria Levy – vocals (2004–2009)
Mark Durante – guitars (2009, 2011)
Raymond Watts – vocals (2011, 2016)
Mona Mur – vocals (2009–2012, 2016)
Paul Wood – live drums (2011)
Dan Simoes – live guitars (2012–2015)
Ethan Moseley – live drums (2012–2016)
Eric Gottesman – live keyboards (2016)
Luke Dangler – live guitars (2016)
Galen Waling – live drums (2016)
Joshua Lutrell – live keyboards (2017)
Wulf Del Reno – live drums (2017)

Discography

Albums

Remix albums

Singles 
 Wien – The Single (2008) – online single

References

External links 
 
 

KMFDM
Musical groups established in 1999
German industrial music groups
Underground, Inc. artists
1999 establishments in Germany